Bridges is the eighth studio album by Josh Groban, released by Reprise on September 21, 2018. It is Groban's first album since 2013's All That Echoes to include original music, and he co-wrote nine of the album's 12 tracks. The deluxe edition includes two bonus tracks.

Background
Speaking to Newsweek, Groban said that after performing on Broadway in The Great Comet from 2016 to 2017, "I didn't even want a break. I just dove into writing. There are some albums, like the last one, where I don't want to write at all, I just want to be a vocalist. Then there are some where you're pouring out idea after idea. I've had sad albums in the past and I wanted an album that had an uplifting spirit, for my psyche and also for the psyche of listeners. I think we all need that."

Commercial performance
Bridges debuted at number two on the US Billboard 200 with 96,000 album-equivalent units, of which 94,000 were pure album sales, and was kept of the tip.of that chart by the fourth studio album by American hip-hop group Brockhampton, Iridescence. It is Groban's ninth US top 10 album. On another chart, it had more success when it debuted at number one on the US Top Album Sales chart dated October 6, 2018.

Track listing
Standard Version

Charts

References

2018 albums
Josh Groban albums
Reprise Records albums